Pyrgotoides is a genus of tephritid  or fruit flies in the family Tephritidae.

Species
Pyrgotoides crassipes Curran,  289
Pyrgotoides paradoxus (Hering, 1942)
Pyrgotoides peruviana (Korytkowski, 1976)

References

Tephritinae
Tephritidae genera
Diptera of South America